In broadcasting, a slate is a title card listing important metadata of a television program, included before the first frame of the program. The broadcasting equivalent of a film leader, the slate is usually accompanied with color bars and tone, a countdown, and a 2-pop. In videotape workflows, slates help ensure that the tape received is the right one to broadcast (or to project, in the case of digital cinema) or to ingest into a digital playout system. It also provides helpful context for consideration in the re-editing of the material into a larger package. A convention from the videotape era of television broadcasting, the need for slates in a tapeless workflow has largely been usurped by the Material Exchange Format. However, the slate is still a regular and often-required fixture of television stations and other media companies .

Common information
Common information to include in a slate includes, but is not limited to:
 Title of the program
 Name of the production company and contact info
 Production code number
 Date of edited master
 Type of master (e.g. broadcast master, duplication master, projection master)
 Timecode of start of first frame (typically 01:00:00.00, with the slate and associated leader material occurring before this)
 Frame rate
 Audio channel configuration
 Presence of textless elements (typically labelled as textless at/@ tail)

References

Television terminology
Film and video technology